A heat detector is a fire alarm device designed to respond when the convected thermal energy of a fire increases the temperature of a heat sensitive element.  The thermal mass and conductivity of the element regulate the rate flow of heat into the element. All heat detectors have this thermal lag. Heat detectors have two main classifications of operation, "rate-of-rise" and "fixed temperature". The heat detector is used to help in the reduction of property damage.

Fixed temperature heat detectors
This is the most common type of heat detector. Fixed temperature detectors operate when the heat sensitive eutectic alloy reaches the eutectic point changing state from a solid to a liquid.  Thermal lag delays the accumulation of heat at the sensitive element so that a fixed-temperature device will reach its operating temperature sometime after the surrounding air temperature exceeds that temperature. The most common fixed temperature point for electrically connected heat detectors is 58°C (136.4°F).

Rate-of-rise heat detectors
Rate-of-Rise (ROR) heat detectors operate on a rapid rise in element temperature of 6.7° to 8.3°C (12° to 15°F) increase per minute, irrespective of the starting temperature. This type of heat detector can operate at a lower temperature fire condition than would be possible if the threshold were fixed. It has two heat-sensitive thermocouples or thermistors. One thermocouple monitors heat transferred by convection or radiation while the other responds to ambient temperature. The detector responds when the first sensing element's temperature increases relative to the other.

Rate of rise detectors may not respond to low energy release rates of slowly developing fires. To detect slowly developing fires combination detectors add a fixed temperature element that will ultimately respond when the fixed temperature element reaches the design threshold.

Heat detector selection
Heat detectors commonly have a label on them that reads "Not a life safety device". That is because heat detectors are not meant to replace smoke detectors in the bedrooms or in the hallway outside of the bedrooms. A heat detector will nonetheless notify of a fire in a kitchen or utility area, e.g., laundry room, garage, or attic, where smoke detectors should not be installed as dust or other particles would affect the smoke detector and cause false alarms. This will allow extra time to evacuate the building or to put out the fire, if possible.

Mechanical heat detectors are independent fire warning stations that—unlike smoke detectors—can be installed in any area of a home. Portability, ease of installation, and excellent performance and reliability make this a good choice for residential fire protection when combined with the required smoke detectors. Because the detectors are not interconnected, heat activation identifies the location of the fire, facilitating evacuation from the home.

Each type of heat detector has its advantages, and it cannot be said that one type of heat detector should always be used instead of another. If one were to place a rate-of-rise heat detector above a large, closed oven, then every time the door is opened a nuisance alarm could be generated due to the sudden heat transient. In this circumstance the fixed threshold detector would probably be best. If a room filled with highly combustible materials is protected with a fixed heat detector, then a fast-flaming fire could exceed the alarm threshold due to thermal lag.  In that case the rate-of-rise heat detector may be preferred.

See also

 Aspirating smoke detector
 Automatic fire suppression
 Carbon monoxide detector
 Fire alarm system
 Fire sprinkler
 Flame detector
 Gaseous fire suppression
 Manual fire alarm activation
 Passive infrared sensor
 Smoke detector

Active fire protection
Safety equipment
Fire detection and alarm
Firefighting equipment
Detectors

ja:自動火災報知設備#感知器